HMIS Madras (J237) was a  that served in the Royal Indian Navy (RIN) during World War II.

History
HMIS Madras was ordered in 1940, and built at Cockatoo Docks in Australia. She was commissioned in 1942 into the Eastern Fleet. She escorted a number of convoys until the end of the war.

See also

Notes

Bathurst-class corvettes of the Royal Indian Navy
1942 ships